Muhammad Reza Pahlevi Isfahani (born 6 August 1998) is an Indonesian badminton player affiliated with Jaya Raya Jakarta club. He was born in Blitar and in 2015, he won the boys' doubles title at the Indonesia Junior International Challenge tournament.

Career 
In 2021, Pahlevi played with Sabar Karyaman Gutama, reaching to the semi finals in the Orléans Masters and the finals in the Spain Masters.

In 2022, Pahlevi and Gutama reached the semi finals in the Singapore Open and Vietnam Open.

2023 
Pahlevi and his partner, Gutama, started the BWF tour in the home tournament, Indonesia Masters, but lost in the second round from Chinese pair He Jiting and Zhou Haodong. In the next tournament, they lost in the first round of the Thailand Masters from unfamous Malaysian pair Low Hang Yee and Ng Eng Cheong in straight sets.

Achievements

BWF World Tour (1 title, 2 runners-up) 
The BWF World Tour, which was announced on 19 March 2017 and implemented in 2018, is a series of elite badminton tournaments sanctioned by the Badminton World Federation (BWF). The BWF World Tours are divided into levels of World Tour Finals, Super 1000, Super 750, Super 500, Super 300, and the BWF Tour Super 100.

Men's doubles

BWF International Challenge/Series (2 titles, 5 runners-up)
Men's doubles

Mixed doubles

  BWF International Challenge tournament
  BWF International Series tournament

Performance timeline 
Performance timeline

National team 
 Junior level

Individual competitions

Senior level

Men's doubles

Mixed doubles

References

External links 
 

Living people
1998 births
People from Blitar
Sportspeople from East Java
Indonesian male badminton players